Association Sportive Saint-Pierraise or ASSP, is a Saint Pierre and Miquelon football club. Founded in 1903, the club is the oldest football team on the island. The club plays their home fixtures at Stade Léonce Claireaux. Its official colours are green and white.

The club advanced to the third round of the 2018–19 Coupe de France, the first edition of the tournament to feature a team from Saint Pierre and Miquelon. The team was eventually eliminated by a narrow 1–2 defeat to ALC Longvic of the Ligue Bourgogne-Franche-Comté dE Football (VII). Maël Kello made history as the first Saint Pierre and Miquelon player to score in the tournament. The club has also competed in the Coupe de Normandie.

Roster 
As of 20 June 2019.

Honours 
 Territory Cup: 1972
 Coupe de l'Archipel: 1990, 1999, 2001, 2007, 2020
 St. Pierre and Miquelon Championship: 1987, 1993, 1994, 1995, 1997, 1998, 2000, 2001, 2007, 2015, 2016, 2019, 2022

References

External links
FFF profile

Football clubs in Saint Pierre and Miquelon
Association football clubs established in 1903